Soeuy Visal (born 19 August 1995) is a Cambodian footballer who plays as a defender for Preah Khan Reach Svay Rieng and the Cambodia national football team.

International career

International goals
Scores and results list Cambodia's goal tally first.

External links

References

1995 births
Living people
Association football defenders
Cambodian footballers
Cambodia international footballers
Preah Khan Reach Svay Rieng FC players
Competitors at the 2017 Southeast Asian Games
Sportspeople from Phnom Penh
Southeast Asian Games competitors for Cambodia